Koneru Ranga Rao (26 July 1936 – 15 March 2010) was an Indian politician. He belonged to Congress party. He was Deputy Chief Minister of Andhra Pradesh.

Early life
Koneru Ranga Rao was a Dalit leader born at Gudavalli, Vijayawada, AP. He did his BA.

Political career
Koneru Ranga Rao was elected as sarpanch of his village Gundavalli and worked for 20 years in the village.

He was elected from Kanipadu constituency to the Andhra Pradesh Legislative Assembly and became Social welfare minister. He was also elected from Tiruviru constituency twice. He also served as Minister for Municipal Development, Endowments. He was the Deputy Chief Minister during the reign of Kotla Vijaya Bhaskara Reddy.

Death
Koneru Ranga Rao died on 15 March 2010.

Personal life
Koneru Ranga Rao was married and had four children. His son in law was an Ex. Member of Parliament, Mallu Ravi.

References

1936 births
2010 deaths
Indian National Congress politicians from Andhra Pradesh
Telugu politicians
Members of the Andhra Pradesh Legislative Assembly
Deputy Chief Ministers of Andhra Pradesh
Politicians from Vijayawada
20th-century Indian politicians